Tyrosinase-related protein 1, also known as TYRP1, is an intermembrane enzyme which in humans is encoded by the TYRP1 gene.

Function 

Tyrp1 is a melanocyte-specific gene product involved in melanin synthesis within melanosomes. Most Tyrp1 possess 5,6-dihydroxyindole-2-carboxylic acid (melanogenic intermediate) oxidase activity.  The  catalytic function of Tyrp1 in human melanocytes is less clear. Tyrp1 is involved in stabilizing of tyrosinase protein and modulating its catalytic activity. Tyrp1 is also involved in maintenance of melanosome structure and affects melanocyte proliferation and melanocyte cell death. Melanocytes are derived from the neural crest and migrate into the overlying epidermal ectoderm of a developing organism which forms skin and hair. Therefore, Tyrp1 influences the expression of melanin notably in the skin and hair of an organism.

The Tyrp1 gene also has a non-coding function which indirectly promotes melanoma tumor cell proliferation, especially when highly expressed in a cell. Tyrp1 mRNA interacts with miR-16 and affects its ability to repress genes involved in melanoma cell production.

Clinical significance 

Mutations in the mouse Tyrp1 gene are associated with brown pelage and in the human TYRP1 gene with oculocutaneous albinism type 3 (OCA3). An allele of TYRP1 common in Solomon Islanders results in blond hair. Although the phenotype is similar to Northern European blond hair, this allele is not found in Europeans. More recent study, Ju et al. 2020 found TYRP1 allele was selected in European population.

Norton et al. 2016 study found TYRP1 is not associated with blond hair color in Melanesians as many populations in Oceania did not carry TYRP1 alleles but still displayed blondism, study indicates that additional unknown alleles contribute to the blondism phenotype in Melanesians.

Alterations of the Tyrp1 gene is responsible for some of the differing phenotypes of skin and coat appearance in various animals. In Dalmatians, black versus "liver" spot color is due to genetic variation of the TYRP1 gene. A particular deletion in the Tyrp1 gene of domestic Chinese-Tibetan swine results in a "brown coloration" of the swine's skin and hair as opposed to the wild-type "black" phenotype. In Oujiang-color  carp, mutations of the Tyrp1 gene influenced the expression of "grey" or "brown" phenotypic color of scales.

Elevated levels of Tyrp1 gene expression is also associated with unfavorable patient outcome of those affected by melanoma.  The role of Tyrp1 in melanoma progression was determined by comparing "knockout" cell lines which have inactive Tyrp1 to cells with normal and highly expressed Tyrp1. Such studies provide insight to possible clinical usage and treatment of melanoma via regulation of Tyrp1 expression in cells.

Regulation 

The expression of TYRP1 is regulated by the microphthalmia-associated transcription factor (MITF).

Interactions 

TYRP1 has been shown to interact with GIPC1.

See also 
 Dopachrome tautomerase (DCT; also known as TYRP2)

References

Further reading

External links